The raspy river stingray, mosaic stingray or arraia (Potamotrygon scobina) is a species of freshwater fish in the family Potamotrygonidae. This stingray is endemic to the Amazon basin in Brazil, where known from the Amazon–Pará River (Belém to near the confluence with the Putumayo River), the Madeira River basin, Uatumã River and lower Tocantins River.

It is fairly common, but threatened by habitat loss. It is part of a group consisting of five allopatric Amazonian stingrays, the others being P. adamastor (Uraricoera River), P. amazona (Juruá, Jutaí and Rio Negro), P. garmani (mid to upper Tocantins River) and P. limai (Jamari River). These all have three angular cartilages (as opposed to the one or two seen in other species in the genus).

References

External links
 Species Description of Potamotrygon scobina at www.shark-references.com

scobina
Freshwater fish of Brazil
Endemic fauna of Brazil
Fish of the Amazon basin
Taxa named by Samuel Garman
Fish described in 1913
Taxonomy articles created by Polbot